This article is about the list of Grupo Desportivo Interclube basketball players. Grupo Desportivo Interclube is an Angolan basketball club from Luanda, Angola and plays their home games at Pavilhão 28 de Fevereiro in Luanda.  The club was established in 1976.

2011–2018
G.D. Interclube women's basketball players 2011–2017 / = Angola league winner/runner-up;/ = African champions cup winner/runner-up

References

G.D. Interclube women's basketball players
Lists of women's basketball players